KIHT (104.7 FM) is a radio station that is licensed to Amboy, California. It is owned by Point Five LLC.

History
KIHT began broadcasting on March 5, 2015.

References

External links

Mass media in San Bernardino County, California
2016 establishments in California
IHT
Radio stations established in 2016